William Fulljames (28 December 1888 – 27 August 1959) was an English professional footballer who played as a centre-half.

References

1888 births
1959 deaths
People from Cleethorpes
English footballers
Association football defenders
Grimsby Rovers F.C. players
St James United F.C. players
Grimsby Town F.C. players
Cleethorpes Victoria F.C. players
Goole Town F.C. players
Scunthorpe United F.C. players
Coventry City F.C. players
Nuneaton Borough F.C. players
Caerphilly F.C. players
English Football League players